The Zhengzhoudong (Zhengzhou East) railway station is a railway station for high-speed trains in Zhengzhou, Henan, China. It is located approximately 3 km southeast of the Zhengdong New Area CBD. On the junction of the North-South Beijing–Guangzhou–Shenzhen–Hong Kong high-speed railway and the East-West Xuzhou–Lanzhou high-speed railway, it is one of the largest passenger railway stations in China.

The calligraphic Chinese characters in the station sign were written by Wu Bangguo, the former Chairman of the Standing Committee of the National People's Congress.

History

The station began construction on 29 June 2009 and was opened on 28 September 2012, together with the opening of the Beijing–Guangzhou–Shenzhen–Hong Kong HSR (Zhengzhou-Wuhan section).

On 26 December 2012, the high-speed train services to Beijing was started with the completion of the Beijing-Zhengzhou section of the Beijing–Guangzhou–Shenzhen–Hong Kong HSR. It takes about only 2.5 hours from the station to Beijing West by high-speed trains.

On 28 December 2013, Zhengzhou Metro Line 1 commenced operation and started to serve the station.

The intercity train services in Zhengzhou East started on 28 December 2014, with the opening of the Zhengzhou-Kaifeng Intercity Railway. Currently, the intercity trains from the station to Songchenglu (Kaifeng), Jiaozuo and Xinzheng Airport are in operation.

The Zhengzhou-Xuzhou section of the Xuzhou–Lanzhou HSR was opened on 10 September 2016, providing high-speed train services to major cities in eastern China, including Shanghai, Nanjing and Hangzhou

With the opening of the Hong Kong section of the Beijing–Guangzhou–Shenzhen–Hong Kong HSR, a daily high-speed train service (G79/80) connecting this station and Hong Kong West Kowloon became available. It takes about 6 hour and 20 minutes from the station to West Kowloon.

Infrastructure
The station covers an area of 219.07 hectares and has a floor area of 350,000 square meters. Costing RMB 4 billion, it consists of 30 platforms (2 side platforms and 14 island platforms) and 32 tracks. Platforms 1-16 are designated for the Beijing–Guangzhou–Shenzhen–Hong Kong high-speed railway and platforms 21-30 designated for the Xuzhou–Lanzhou High-Speed Railway. Platforms 17-20 are for intercity trains.

The station has a total of 7 levels of which 3 are below ground level. The departure hall (waiting area) is on the 3rd level while catering services are provided on the 4th level. Platforms are on the 2nd level. The arrival areas, exits and parking areas are on the ground level. The basement levels are for Zhengzhou Metro.

Self-service flight check-in devices are provided in the intercity waiting area of the departure hall for passengers taking the intercity trains to Zhengzhou Xinzheng International Airport.

Destinations

Gallery

Metro station

Zhengzhou East railway station is a metro station of Zhengzhou Metro. It is located just beneath the high-speed railway station.

Currently, the station has Line 1 and Line 5 in operation. Reserved platforms for Line 8 had been constructed. In the future, cross-platform interchange between Line 5 and Line 8 will be realized.

Station layout

The station has 3 levels underground with 3 island platforms (6 platforms in total). The B1 level is for the station concourse, which houses the customer service center and ticket vending machines. The single island platform for Line 1 is on the B2 level. The dual island platforms for Line 5 and Line 8 are on the B3 level, of which the platforms for Line 8 are not open to public since Line 8 is not operational yet.

See also
Zhengzhou railway station
Zhengzhou South railway station
Zhengzhou Metro

References

Railway stations in Henan
Railway stations in Zhengzhou
Stations on the Shijiazhuang–Wuhan High-Speed Railway
Stations on the Xuzhou–Lanzhou High-Speed Railway
Stations on the Zhengzhou–Kaifeng Intercity Railway
Stations of Zhengzhou Metro
Line 1, Zhengzhou Metro
Line 5, Zhengzhou Metro
Railway stations in China opened in 2012